Lyman Hall (February 18, 1859 – August 16, 1905) was a professor and president of the Georgia School of Technology (now called the Georgia Institute of Technology, commonly referred to as Georgia Tech). Hall's administration introduced degrees in electrical engineering and civil engineering in December 1896, textile engineering in February 1899, and engineering chemistry in January 1901. 

Hall died in 1905, reportedly due to the stress of fundraising for a new chemistry building which now bears his name.

Early life 
Born in 1859 in Americus, Georgia, he attended Mercer University in Penfield, Georgia. He was admitted to the United States Military Academy in 1877, and graduated in 1881. Due to a physical disability, he was unable to have a military career; instead, he taught mathematics at the Georgia Military Academy in Kirkwood, Georgia for two years and subsequently at the South Carolina Military Academy in Charleston, South Carolina (now known as "The Citadel") from 1883 to 1886. He was then a professor at the Moreland Park Military Academy before Georgia Tech recruited him.

Career 
In 1888, Captain Lyman Hall was appointed Georgia Tech's first mathematics professor (and consequently head of the school's mathematics department). He had a solid background in engineering due to his time at West Point and often incorporated surveying and other engineering applications into his coursework. He had an energetic personality and quickly assumed a leadership position among the faculty. At the first faculty meeting on October 5, 1888, he was elected secretary. On June 25, 1895, Professor Hall was invited to speak to Georgia Tech's board about the school's needs. While there were no recorded minutes, subsequent board actions suggest that he recommended the construction of on-campus dormitories to reduce disciplinary problems, and a more proactive recruitment of students.

Previous president Isaac S. Hopkins tendered his resignation in May 1895 because he had been elected president of the First Methodist Church of Atlanta and he could not do "justice to both to the school and the church". While several successors were considered, Samuel M. Inman proposed that the decision be postponed. Georgia Tech's trustees correspondingly elected Hall as the chairman of the faculty (acting president) From January 1, 1896 to July 1, 1896. On June 24, the trustees elected him the institute's second president.

In February 1899, Georgia Tech opened the first textile engineering school in the Southern United States, with $10,000 from the Georgia General Assembly, $20,000 of donated machinery, and $13,500 from supporters. The school was named the A. French Textile School, after its chief donor and supporter, Aaron S. French.

Lyman Hall's other goals included enlarging Tech and attracting more students, so he expanded the school's offerings beyond mechanical engineering; the new degrees introduced during Hall's administration included electrical engineering and civil engineering in December 1896, textile engineering in February 1899, and engineering chemistry in January 1901. Hall also became infamous as a disciplinarian, even suspending the entire senior class of 1901 for returning from Christmas vacation a day late.

Lyman Hall died on August 16, 1905 during a vacation at a New York health resort. His death while still in office was attributed to stress from his strenuous fund raising activities (this time, for a new Chemistry building). Later that year, the school's trustees named the new chemistry building the "Lyman Hall Laboratory of Chemistry" in his honor.

Lyman Hall building 
The Lyman Hall Laboratory of Chemistry at Georgia Tech was erected in 1905. It now houses the Bursar's Office after being completely gutted in 1989, but the quote from geologist Sir Archibald Geikie's 1905 published work remains on the front of the building: "In the first place I would put accuracy."

The 1903 to 1906 school announcements describe the architecture of the building in great detail:

The building is located within the Georgia Institute of Technology Historic District, and it is included in the 12-building area listed on the National Register of Historic Places.

See also 
 History of Georgia Tech

References

1859 births
1905 deaths
People from Americus, Georgia
Presidents of Georgia Tech
Mercer University alumni
United States Military Academy alumni